"Taboo" is the second single from Don Omar's collaborative album Meet the Orphans released on January 24, 2011 through Universal Latino. The song is re-adapted version from Los Kjarkas's song "Llorando se fue" most commonly known for its use in Kaoma's 1989 hit single "Lambada" fused with Latin beats. The song peaked at number one on the Billboard Latin Songs, becoming his third number one single on the chart.

Background
A low-quality preview of the song was posted on October 19, 2009 planned to be included on the now-unreleased album iDon 2.0, the re-release of his 2009 album iDon. The album was never released, and in 2010 the song was mastered and included on Meet the Orphans. And Another Version Sounds In Danza Kuduro

Critical reception
Brian Voerding from Aol Radio Blog said that the song "It's a down-and-dirty dance number that melds traditional island rhythms with a techno-friendly undercurrent and bright synthesizer melodies. [...]" Omar, along with Daddy Yankee and others, is one of the primary faces and souls of Reggaeton, a relatively new term for music that blends reggae with contemporary hip-hop and electronic elements. received and award for "Urban Song of the Year" at the 2012 ASCAP Awards, which are awarded annually by the American Society of Composers, Authors and Publishers in the United States.

Chart performance
On the issue of March 5, 2011 the song debuted at number 41 on the Billboard Latin Songs, peaking at number one on the week of July 16, 2011, becoming his third number one single on the chart, and number 23 on the Billboard Latin Pop Airplay, peaking at number 2. On the issue of April 2, 2011 the song debuted at number 28 on the Latin Tropical Airplay, peaking at number 1. On the issue of May 14, 2011 the song also debuted on the Bubbling Under Hot 100 Singles chart at position 15, and weeks after, topped the chart. It later debuted at number 97 on the Billboard Hot 100 giving Don Omar his third single to enter the chart.

Remix
On January 28, 2012 an official remix produced by Daddy Yankee's producers Musicologo & Menes "Los de la nazza". This remix in which Don Omar is joined with Daddy Yankee was featured on Musicologo & Menes' debut mixtape El Imperio Nazza.

Music video

Development
The music video for the song was shot in both the Dominican Republic and Brazil, directed by Marlon Pena and produced by Noelia Cacavelli. It was premiered on April 12, 2011 through Vevo and YouTube. The music video contains clips from the 2011 movie Fast Five (also known as Fast & Furious 5), where he is guest star, as well guest appearances from the movie cast including Vin Diesel, Paul Walker, Tyrese Gibson, Dwayne Johnson, Ludacris and Tego Calderón.

Reception
According to Don Omar's Universal website, the video has a strong storyline and recaptures the essence of the popular Brazilian version, which is heavily influenced by choreographed dance moves. As of January 2019, the music video has received 460 million views, becoming his second most viewed video after "Danza Kuduro".

Charts

Weekly charts

Year-end charts

Decade-end charts

References

External links
Taboo (music video) Vevo

2011 singles
Spanish-language songs
Don Omar songs
Machete Music singles
Universal Music Latino singles
2010 songs